Odyssey is a vocal trio,  originally from New York City, best known for its 1977 hit "Native New Yorker", and a series of other mainly dance and soul hits in the late 1970s and early 1980s. Now based in the United Kingdom, the band is led and fronted by Steven Collazo and continues to perform and record.

Career
The group began as the Connecticut-born "Lopez Sisters" group, featuring Steven Collazo's mother, Lillian Lopez (Lillian Lopez Collazo Jackson; November 16, 1935 – September 4, 2012), Louise Lopez (February 22, 1933 – January 28, 2015), and Carmen Lopez (July 12, 1934 - April 22, 2016), the latter having left the group before Odyssey, as the act would come to be known after her departure, was conceived.

Filipino bassist and singer Tony Reynolds joined the group soon after "Native New Yorker" reached no. 21 on the Billboard Hot 100, no. 5 in the UK Singles Chart. A string of albums and singles followed and the group managed another R&B chart hit, "Inside Out", written by Jesse Rae, produced by Jimmy Douglass and featuring music performed by session musicians. It peaked on the US R&B charts at no. 12 and in the UK went to no. 3 in 1982. The song was ranked at number 15 among the "Tracks of the Year" for 1982 by NME.

Reynolds, for unknown reasons, left after the first album and was replaced by Fayetteville, North Carolina, native William "Bill" McEachern, who remained with the group throughout the remainder of its RCA Records output. During that time, Brooklyn-born Steven Collazo joined the group as keyboardist, vocalist and musical director. Tony Reynolds died on February 2, 2010, in Jamaica, Queens, New York.

In the United Kingdom, the band, with its diverse musical style had more chart success, totalling five Top Ten hits between 1977 and 1982. One of them, "Use It Up and Wear It Out", reached number one in the UK Singles Chart for two weeks in 1980. The UK follow-up single, "If You're Lookin' for a Way Out" had Lillian Lopez on lead vocals; the single reaching no. 6 in 1980 and spending a total of fifteen weeks in the UK chart. Odyssey thus became the third US act of the year (after Fern Kinney and M.A.S.H.) to reach number one in the UK despite not charting in their home country. Their later hit "Going Back to My Roots" was written and originally recorded by Lamont Dozier.

After leaving RCA, Odyssey, composed of lead vocalist Lillian Lopez, Al Jackson and Steven Collazo, continued touring, performing, and making television appearances throughout the United Kingdom, Europe and the Middle East. Lopez and Jackson married in 2000 and retired from the music industry in 2003. Lopez died on September 4, 2012, of cancer.

Legacy
Odyssey's "If You're Looking for a Way Out" was covered by Tindersticks on their 1999 album, Simple Pleasure. "Inside Out" was covered by Electribe 101 on their 1990 album Electribal Memories and subsequently released as a single. Other covers of Odyssey's material include "Don't Tell Me Tell Her" by Phyllis Hyman and "Native New Yorker" by Esther Phillips, amongst others. The band, now led by Steven Collazo, featured vocalist twins Annis and Anne Peters and released the album Legacy in June 2011 on ISM Records. The twins left the group in January 2013, and were replaced by song stylist Jerdene Wilson and recording artist Romina Johnson. Johnson is known for her vocals and collaboration with Artful Dodger on the 2000 hit song "Movin' Too Fast". In 2014–15, Odyssey released their Together EP via ISM records.

Discography

Studio albums

Compilation albums

Singles

References

External links
Official website

Odyssey discography at Discogs

American disco groups
American soul musical groups
Musical groups established in 1977
1977 establishments in New York City
Musical groups from New York City